Jay Abbass (born 1957) is a lawyer, businessman, former stockbroker and former political figure in Nova Scotia, Canada. He represented Halifax Chebucto in the Nova Scotia House of Assembly from 1993 to 1998 as a Liberal member.

Early life
He was born in Fredericton, New Brunswick and was educated at Saint Mary's University and Dalhousie University.

Political career
Abbass was an unsuccessful candidate for a seat in the provincial assembly in the 1988 election, finishing third in the Halifax Citadel riding. In the 1993 election, he defeated New Democrat Eileen O'Connell by 106 votes in the Halifax Chebucto riding. He served in the Executive Council of Nova Scotia as Minister of Labour, Minister of Human Resources, Minister of Justice and Attorney General. Abbass resigned from cabinet on April 1, 1997, and announced he was not running in the next election.

After politics
Abbass was named to the board of governors for Dalhousie University in 2006.

References 
 Entry from Canadian Who's Who

1957 births
Living people
Members of the Executive Council of Nova Scotia
Nova Scotia Liberal Party MLAs
Dalhousie University alumni
Saint Mary's University (Halifax) alumni
Politicians from Fredericton
People from Halifax, Nova Scotia